"Kaban" is a single recorded by the iban rock band Masterpiece. The song was officially released on October 19, 2016 through YouTube via their independent label, Masterjam Studio. The song was released as a digital download single on the same day. In an interview with The Borneo Post on December 8, the band had announced that "Kaban" is the promotional single for their upcoming fifth studio album which planned to be released in 2017.

Track listing
 "Kaban" (Radio Version) - 5:53

Music video
The music video was directed by Kennedy Edwin and filmed on various location and venue around Sarawak features the band candid footage while on tour and live on a stage between July and September 2016.

Personnel
Masterpiece
 Willy Edwin – guitars, recording technician 
 Kennedy Edwin (Kent) – guitars, backing & 2nd vocals 
 Watt Marcus – bass 
 Depha – lead vocals, composer & songwriter 
 Harold Vincent – drums 
 Roslee Kadir  – keyboards 
 Valentine Jimmy (Emek) – keyboards

Production
 Masterpiece - producer
 Iskandar iMusik Studio - mixing
 Iskandar iMusik Studio - mastering

References

External links
 Lyrics of this song on Lirik Lagu Iban

2016 songs
Masterpiece (band) songs
2016 singles